Romania has an extensive and a large diplomatic network.

This listing excludes honorary consulates, trade missions, and cultural institutes.

Current missions

Africa

Americas

Asia

Europe

Oceania

Multilateral organizations

Gallery

Closed missions

Africa

Americas

Asia

Europe

Oceania

See also

 List of diplomatic missions in Romania
 Foreign relations of Romania
 Visa requirements for Romanian citizens
 List of Romanian diplomats

Notes

External links

Ministry of Foreign Affairs of Romania

References

 
Diplomatic missions
Romania